Hitching could refer to:

 Hitching (short story), a short story by Orson Scott Card
 Hitching tie, a knot
 Ringbolt hitching, a knot
 Hitchhiking,
 Hitching, a synonym for lag-related overclocking (i.e. when a digital image runs smoothly, stops and repeat again)

See also

 Hitchin (disambiguation)
 Hitching post (disambiguation)
 Hitchings, a surname